Cliniodes saburralis is a moth in the family Crambidae. It was described by Achille Guenée in 1854. It is found in the Andes from Colombia to central Bolivia.

References

Moths described in 1854
Eurrhypini